The Unidentified is a 2008 drama film by writer-director Kevan Tucker in his directorial debut for Floodgate Features. It won "Best New Director" at the 2008 Brooklyn International Film Festival and "Best First Feature" at the 2008 FirstGlance Film Festival in Philadelphia. It also screened at the Asheville Film Festival and Methodfest Film Festival in 2008, and is available on DVD through Vanguard Cinema. It is considered part of the mumblecore movement.

The film was shot on the Panasonic AG-DVX100A with a Redrock M2 attachment.

Plot
Estlin is a journalist in New York City, fresh out of college and ready to make a difference in an all-too cynical world. He struggles with defining career and relationships, and after his best friend Brooke moves away, finds himself falling for Sophie, a downtown photographer. Estlin must confront whether his dogged pursuit of truth helps or hinders his attempt to find a place in the world.

External links 
 

2008 films
2008 romantic comedy-drama films
American romantic comedy-drama films
American independent films
2008 independent films
2008 comedy films
2008 drama films
2000s English-language films
2000s American films